Sa'ilele is a village on the north shore in the Eastern District of Tutuila Island in American Samoa. It is reached from a cross-island road which leads north from the village of Faga'itua. By turning off at the pass, the turn-off takes you down a narrow road through dense forest to Sa'ilele. The village is known for having some of Tutuila's best swimming beaches. The sandy area below the rock outcrops at the western end of the beach is also a popular site for picnics. On a track east of the village is a burial ground where some ali'i (high chiefs) were buried.

Sa'ilele was home to the only pre-Christian temple ever documented on Tutuila Island: Sa'ilele Mālumālu. The temple consisted of a small fale about ten feet in length, covered by a low roof. The structure was set in a thick and sacred grove of coconut trees. Rocks discovered inside the temple were referred to as The Immovable Rock, The Enduring Power and The Rock Fixed in the Kingdom.

In 2002, Sa’ilele's highest chief, Matua, Togiola Talalelei A. Tulafono, became Governor of American Samoa.

Etymology
According to a high chief of the village, the word Sa’ilele derived from the presence of the god Tuliatua, and the goddesses Nafanua, Tilafaiga and Taema. HTC's Vaesa’u Talauega Letumu explained in an interview: Sa’ilele was a village full of ghosts and supernatural spirits in the past, hence the name Sa-i-le-ele’ele (meaning forbidden grounds). Tualiatua's dwelling place was known as the heathen temple, malumalu faapaupau, which was located in the center of the village with a sacred coconut grove next to it. The temple was around six feet tall and ten feet wide. Inside the temple were three stones: the immovable stone, the constant government, and the stone fixed in the kingdom. These stones were buried by the village when missionaries arrived.

Demographics

According to the 2010 U.S. Census, the village population was 75, down from 100 residents recorded in the 2000 U.S. Census. The majority of residents are in the age range of 35–44. Working-class residents of Sa’ilele hold jobs in the American Samoa Government and at the StarKist Samoa Tuna Factory. Its main denominations are the Roman Catholic Church and the Congregational Christian Church in American Samoa (CCCAS). The CCCAS has 68 members in Sa'ilele.

Geography
Due to its natural beauty, the village of Sa’ilele attracts numerous visitors that drive through the terrain and look over the mountains and landscape. Sa’ilele is approximately 12 miles northeast of Pago Pago, which is about a 20-minute car ride. To get to Sa’ilele, one goes through the villages on the eastern south shore of Tutuila until reaching Fagaitua, where a left turn takes you up the winding hilly road to Masausi and Sa’ilele. The village of Sa'ilele has some of American Samoa's most beautiful sandy beaches. Sa'ilele is tucked behind the mountain. It has a beach with tropical pine trees, palm trees, and a secluded bay. Towards the end of the beach is a line of lava rock that stretches into the ocean, remnants of the ancient lava flow.

Economy
Many Sa'ilele residents are fishermen and seafood is a mainstay of the local diet. The land is fertile for both subsistence and commercial farming. All families have at least one small plantation in their backyard for daily consumption. Commercial agriculture include taro, yams, bananas, papayas, and vegetables.

References 

Villages in American Samoa
Tutuila